The Shawnee National Forest is a United States National Forest located in the Ozark and Shawnee Hills of Southern Illinois, United States. Administered by the U.S.D.A. Forest Service, it consists of approximately 280,000 acres (1,100 km²) of federally managed lands. In descending order of land area it is located in parts of Pope, Jackson, Union, Hardin, Alexander, Saline, Gallatin, Johnson, and Massac counties. Forest headquarters are located in Harrisburg, Illinois. There are local ranger district offices in Jonesboro and Vienna.  The Shawnee National Forest is also the single largest publicly owned body of land in the state of Illinois. It is considered part of Southern Illinois, and is south of the St. Louis, Missouri, and Metro East areas, in area code 618. Portions of it are in the far south area of Illinois known as Little Egypt. Cities in or near the area are Carbondale, Illinois, Marion, Illinois, and Cairo, Illinois.

Designated as the Illini and Shawnee Purchase Units, President Franklin D. Roosevelt declared these purchase units to be the Shawnee National Forest in September 1939.  Most of the land added to the Forest in its first decade of existence was exhausted farmland. Throughout the 1930s and 1940s, the Civilian Conservation Corps planted pine trees to prevent erosion and help rebuild the soil. However, the Forest is also home to many hardwood trees and other plant and animal species characteristic of the region.

In the 1980s and 1990s, there was an active history of conservation and protest efforts by local, regional, and national environmental groups and individuals ranging from radical movements such as Earth First! to mainstream organizations such as the Sierra Club and the Green Party. The wise use movement once played an active role in lobbying for its vision of the Shawnee National Forest.  Today a more cooperative atmosphere has developed, although some controversy remains with a few.

In 2006, the Forest Service completed the development of a new Forest Management Plan for the Shawnee National Forest. This plan, adopted every 10–15 years, outlines the policies and practices of the U.S. Forest Service in overseeing the management of the Shawnee National Forest.  The 2006 Forest Plan was completed in collaboration with many environmental and public groups and is designed to maintain and enhance the forest's unique biodiversity.

Geology
During the Illinoian Stage (between 352,000 and 132,000 years ago), the Laurentide Ice Sheet covered up to 85 percent of Illinois. The southern margin of this ice sheet was located within what is now the area of the Shawnee National Forest. There are many points of interest marking the southern edge of the glacier. Some are located within the Forest boundary, others are on public land in proximity.

Little Grand Canyon is located within the Shawnee National Forest. This is accessible off Illinois Route 127 south of Murphysboro, Illinois. A small creek with a tiny watershed has carved an impressive rock canyon, more than 200 feet deep, leading down to the Big Muddy River. The southern edge of the ice sheet was just to the north of Little Grand Canyon. Blocks of ice slid off the face of the glacier, carried by enormous volumes of meltwater, to carve this tiny canyon. In the deep shade of the canyon are relict species of Arctic plants left over from its ancient origin.

Cedar Lake is an artificial lake formed by damming Cedar Creek. The lake is accessible off Illinois Route 127, south of Murphysboro, and off U.S. 51, south of Carbondale. In this area, the Illinoian Glacier climbed the Shawnee Hills at its southern margin. The glacier blocked the waterways flowing north down the hills. This drainage formed a creek running northwest along the face of the glacier. This became Cedar Creek, the watershed of which is extremely asymmetrical. While the watershed extends only a few thousand feet to the south, up the face of the terminal moraine, the creek is also fed by waterways extending miles to the south.

Within the area of the Shawnee National Forest, but not at this time US property, is Hicks Dome, an igneous feature in Hardin County, Illinois. This was formerly speculated to be the result of a hot spot, but some argue it was caused by a meteorite impact.

Rock climbing
In northwestern Pope County, Jackson Falls is a noted location for rock climbing and speed climbing.

Wilderness areas
There are seven officially designated wilderness areas lying within Shawnee National Forest that are part of the National Wilderness Preservation System.
 Bald Knob Wilderness
 Bay Creek Wilderness
 Burden Falls Wilderness
 Clear Springs Wilderness
 Garden of the Gods Wilderness 
 Lusk Creek Wilderness
 Panther Den Wilderness
There are three natural vegetation research areas: Cave Hill, Stoneface, and Whoopie Cat Mountain Research Natural Areas in the Shawnee National Forest.

Recreation areas
 Pounds Hollow

Coinage
Shawnee National Forest appeared on the thirty-first quarter in the America the Beautiful Quarters series in 2016.

Eclipse viewing
The Shawnee National Forest was among the best sites from which to view the solar eclipse of August 21, 2017, with two minutes 44 seconds of totality and will be again in 2024.

References

External links

 Shawnee National Forest - The official Forest Service site for the Shawnee National Forest